The Blue Route is a cycling network under development in the Canadian province of Nova Scotia. The first  section opened in 2015, linking Pictou to Bible Hill, and the whole network is expected to be completed by 2025.

References

External links
 Blue Route website

Long-distance cycling routes
Bike paths in Nova Scotia